K. Tempest Bradford (born April 19, 1978 in Cincinnati, Ohio) is an African-American science fiction and fantasy author and editor. She was a non-fiction and managing editor with Fantasy Magazine from 2007 to 2009 and has edited fiction for Peridot Books, The Fortean Bureau and Sybil's Garage. She is the author of Ruby Finley vs. the Interstellar Invasion, her debut middle grade novel published in 2022.

Biography
A graduate of New York University's Gallatin School of Individualized Study, Bradford is also an alumna of the Clarion West Writers Workshop (class of 2003) and the Online Writing Workshop (formerly Del Rey). Bradford has been a juror for the James Tiptree, Jr. Award and is currently Vice-Chair of the Carl Brandon Society Steering Committee.

Bradford is an activist for racial and gender equality both within and outside of the science fiction community. In 2005, she founded the Angry Black Woman blog, and her contributions under that moniker have appeared in Feminist SF: The Blog, ColorLines, NPR's News & Notes, and in African-American studies textbooks.

She teaches creative writing classes that focus on writing inclusive narratives for Writing the Other, LitReactor, and Clarion West.

Selected works

Fiction
 Ruby Finley vs. the Interstellar Invasion (September 2022, Farrar, Straus and Giroux (BYR))
 "The Copper Scarab" in Clockwork Cairo, ed. Matthew Bright, 2017 and Sunspot Jungle: The Ever Expanding Universe of Fantasy and Science Fiction, ed. Bill Campbell, 2019.
 "Until Forgiveness Comes" in Strange Horizons, 2008 and In the Shadow of the Towers: Speculative Fiction in a Post-9/11 World, ed. Douglas Lain, 2015
 "Uncertainty Principle" in Diverse Energies, 2012.
 "Black Feather" in Interfictions, 2007; PodCastle, 2010, and Happily Ever After, ed. John Klima, 2011.
 "Elan Vital" in Sybil's Garage No. 6, 2009 and EscapePod episode 269, 2010.
 "Enmity" in Electric Velocipede issue 17/18, 2009.
 "Different Day" in Federations, 2009.
 "The Seventh Reflection" in Thou Shalt Not... a horror and dark fantasy anthology, 2006.
 "Change of Life" in Farthing, 2006; PodCastle, 2009.
 "Hard Rain" in Farthing, 2006.
 "Why I Don't Drink Anymore" (as Finley Larkin) in Abyss & Apex, 2003.
 "Elf Aware" (as Finley Larkin) in Cafe Irreal, 2002; PodCastle, 2009.
 "What We Make Of It" in Peridot Books, 2000.

Non-fiction

 "Androids and Allegory", Mother of Invention anthology supplementary essay, Twelfth Planet Press, 2018.
 "Representation Matters: A Literary Call To Arms", LitReactor Magazine, 2017.
 "Cultural Appropriation Is, In Fact, Indefensible", NPR Code Switch blog, 2017.
 io9 Newsstand, a weekly column at io9, 2014 - 2015.
 "An ‘Unexpected’ Treat For Octavia E. Butler Fans", NPR Book Review, 2014.
 "Invisible Bisexuality in Torchwood", Apex Magazine, 2014.
 "Women Are Destroying Science Fiction! (That’s OK; They Created It)", NPR Books, 2014.
 "What Will Be The Next Game Of Thrones? We’ve Got Some Ideas", NPR Books, 2014.
 "The Women We Don't See: Season Thirteen", Chicks Unravel Time: Women Journey Through Every Season of Doctor Who. Mad Norwegian Press, 2012.
 "Why Abraham Lincoln: Vampire Hunter is The Ultimate White Guilt Fantasy", io9, 2012.
 "Martha Jones: Fangirl Blues", Chicks Dig Time Lords. Mad Norwegian Press, 2010.
 "Why 'Black' and Not 'African American'?", Key Debates: An Introduction To African American Studies. Ed. Henry Louis Gates, Jr. and Jennifer Burton (January 2010)
 Q&A, The WisCon Chronicles, vol. 1. Aqueduct Press, 2007.
 "On the Clarion Workshops", The WisCon Chronicles, vol. 2. Aqueduct Press, 2008.
 "WisCon and POC Spaces", The WisCon Chronicles, vol. 3: Carnival of Feminist SF. Aqueduct Press, 2009.

Role-playing games 

 Van Richten's Guide to Ravenloft (writer, Wizards of the Coast, 2021)

Awards

Notes

External links

Entry at the Feminist SF wiki

Angry Black Woman blog

1978 births
African-American activists
21st-century American short story writers
21st-century American women writers
African-American bloggers
American bloggers
African-American feminists
African-American non-fiction writers
African-American short story writers
American fantasy writers
American feminist writers
American science fiction writers
American social commentators
American speculative fiction critics
American speculative fiction editors
American women bloggers
American women non-fiction writers
American women short story writers
Black speculative fiction authors
Feminist bloggers
Living people
New York University Gallatin School of Individualized Study alumni
Science fiction critics
Science fiction editors
Women science fiction and fantasy writers
Writers from Cincinnati
21st-century American non-fiction writers
African-American novelists
21st-century African-American women writers
21st-century African-American writers
20th-century African-American people
20th-century African-American women